= North Ontario =

North Ontario may refer to:

- Northern Ontario, the northern portion of the Canadian province of Ontario
- Upland, a community in California formerly named North Ontario
